Wu Tat Cheung (born 17 February 1974) is a Hong Kong freestyle swimmer. He competed in three events at the 1992 Summer Olympics.

References

External links
 

1974 births
Living people
Hong Kong male freestyle swimmers
Olympic swimmers of Hong Kong
Swimmers at the 1992 Summer Olympics
Place of birth missing (living people)
Swimmers at the 1990 Asian Games
Asian Games competitors for Hong Kong